Rhipicephalus is a genus of ticks in the family Ixodidae, the hard ticks, consisting of about 74 or 75 species. Most are native to tropical Africa.

Species are difficult to distinguish from one another because most are quite similar, while individuals of one particular species can be quite variable. Most of the characteristics used to identify species pertain to male and immature specimens, and "females are sometimes simply impossible to identify".

Many Rhipicephalus spp. are of economic, medical, and veterinary importance because they are vectors of pathogens. They transmit the pathogens that cause the animal and human diseases East Coast fever, anaplasmosis, babesiosis, rickettsiosis, Boutonneuse fever, Lyme disease, Q fever, Rocky Mountain spotted fever, and Crimean–Congo hemorrhagic fever, and they inject a neurotoxin in their bite that leads to tick-caused paralysis.

Boophilus was once considered a separate genus, but studies in the early 2000s resulted in Boophilus being made a subgenus of Rhipicephalus.

Species familiar in the domestic environment include the brown dog tick (R. sanguineus).

Etymology
The name Rhipicephalus is derived from the Greek word rhiphis, meaning "fan-like", and κεφαλή, kephalē, meaning "head". The two terms are related to the hexagonal basis capituli of Rhipicephalus.

Epidemiology
Rhipicephalus  bursa is a carrier of babesiosis, theileriosis and anaplasmosis in domestic animals, of the Nairobi sheep disease, and an aggressive vector of the agents of the Crimean–Congo hemorrhagic fever and of the Q fever.

Species

 Rhipicephalus appendiculatus Neumann 1901 – brown ear tick
 Rhipicephalus aquatilis Walker, Keirans & Pegram, 1993
 Rhipicephalus armatus Pocock, 1900
 Rhipicephalus arnoldi Theiler & Zumpt, 1949
 Rhipicephalus australis Fuller, 1899
 Rhipicephalus bequaerti Zumpt, 1949
 Rhipicephalus bergeoni Morel & Balis, 1976
 Rhipicephalus boueti Morel, 1957
 Rhipicephalus bursa Canestrini & Fanzago, 1878
 Rhipicephalus camicasi Morel, Mouchet & Rodhain, 1976
 Rhipicephalus capensis Koch, 1844
 Rhipicephalus carnivoralis Walker, 1966
 Rhipicephalus complanatus Neumann, 1911
 Rhipicephalus compositus Neumann, 1897
 Rhipicephalus congolensis Apanaskevich, Horak & Mulumba-Mfumu, 2013
 Rhipicephalus cuspidatus Neumann, 1906
 Rhipicephalus decoloratus Koch, 1844
 Rhipicephalus deltoideus Neumann, 1910
 Rhipicephalus distinctus Bedford 1932
 Rhipicephalus duttoni Neumann, 1907
 Rhipicephalus dux Dönitz, 1910
Rhipicephalus evertsi Neumann, 1897
 Rhipicephalus exophthalmos Keirans & Walker 1993
 Rhipicephalus follis Dönitz, 1910
 Rhipicephalus fulvus Neumann, 1913
 Rhipicephalus gertrudae Feldman-Muhsam, 1960
 Rhipicephalus glabroscutatum Du Toit, 1941
 Rhipicephalus guilhoni Morel & Vassiliades, 1963
 Rhipicephalus haemaphysaloides Supino, 1897
 Rhipicephalus hoogstraali Kolonin, 2009
 Rhipicephalus humeralis Rondelli, 1926
 Rhipicephalus hurti Wilson, 1954
 Rhipicephalus interventus Walker, Pegram & Keirans, 1995
 Rhipicephalus jeanneli Neumann 1913
 Rhipicephalus kochi Dönitz, 1905
 Rhipicephalus leporis Pomerantsev, 1946
 Rhipicephalus longiceps Warburton 1912
 Rhipicephalus longicoxatus Neumann, 1905
 Rhipicephalus longus Neumann, 1907
 Rhipicephalus lounsburyi Walker, 1990
 Rhipicephalus lunulatus Neumann 1907
 Rhipicephalus maculatus Neumann, 1901
 Rhipicephalus masseyi Nuttall & Warburton 1908
 Rhipicephalus microplus (Canestrini, 1888)
 Rhipicephalus moucheti Morel, 1965
 Rhipicephalus muehlensi Zumpt, 1943
 Rhipicephalus muhsamae Morel & Vassiliades, 1965
 Rhipicephalus neumanni Walker, 1990
 Rhipicephalus nitens Neumann, 1904
 Rhipicephalus oculatus Neumann 1901
 Rhipicephalus oreotragi Walker & Horak, 2000
 Rhipicephalus pilans Schulze, 1935
 Rhipicephalus planus Neumann, 1907
 Rhipicephalus praetextatus Gerstäcker, 1873
 Rhipicephalus pravus Dönitz, 1910
 Rhipicephalus pseudolongus Santos Dias, 1953
 Rhipicephalus pulchellus Gerstäcker, 1873
 Rhipicephalus pumilio Schulze, 1935
 Rhipicephalus punctatus Warburton 1912
 Rhipicephalus pusillus Gil Collado, 1936
 Rhipicephalus ramachandrai Dhanda, 1966
 Rhipicephalus rossicus Yakimov & Kol-Yakimova, 1911
 Rhipicephalus sanguineus Latreille, 1806 – brown dog tick
 Rhipicephalus scalpturatus Santos Dias, 1959
 Rhipicephalus schulzei Olenev 1929
 Rhipicephalus sculptus Warburton 1912
 Rhipicephalus senegalensis Koch, 1844
 Rhipicephalus serranoi Santos Dias 1950
 Rhipicephalus simpsoni Nuttall 1910
 Rhipicephalus simus Koch, 1844
 Rhipicephalus sulcatus Neumann, 1908
 Rhipicephalus supertritus Neumann, 1907
 Rhipicephalus tetracornus Kitaoka & Suzuki, 1983
 Rhipicephalus theileri Bedford & Hewitt, 1925
 Rhipicephalus tricuspis Dönitz, 1906
 Rhipicephalus turanicus Pomerantsev 1936
 Rhipicephalus warburtoni Walker & Horak, 2000
 Rhipicephalus zambeziensis Walker, Norval & Corwin, 1981
 Rhipicephalus zumpti Santos Dias, 1950

Subgenus Boophilus

 Rhipicephalus annulatus Say, 1821
 Rhipicephalus decoloratus Koch, 1844
 Rhipicephalus geigyi Aeschlimann & Morel, 1965
 Rhipicephalus kohlsi Hoogstraal & Kaiser, 1960
 Rhipicephalus microplus Canestrini, 1888 – southern cattle tick

References

Further reading

External links

Guglielmone, A. A., et al. (2010). The Argasidae, Ixodidae and Nuttalliellidae (Acari: Ixodida) of the world: A list of valid species names. Zootaxa (2528), 1-28.

Ticks
Taxa named by Carl Ludwig Koch
Ixodidae